James Lister Cuthbertson (8 May 1851 – 18 January 1910) was a Scottish-Australian poet and schoolteacher.

Early life and education
James Cuthbertson was born in Glasgow, Scotland, the eldest son of William Gilmour Cuthbertson and his wife, Jane Agnes Cuthbertson. James was  educated at the secondary school, Trinity College, Glenalmond, Perthshire, where he played on the school cricket team. He studied for the Indian civil service, and having been admitted as a probationer went on to Merton College, University of Oxford, England. He failed to pass a necessary examination and was obliged to abandon the idea of a career in India. 

After his father became  manager of the Bank of South Australia at Adelaide, in 1874 Cuthbertson decided to go to Australia.

Teaching career
In 1875 Cuthbertson joined the staff of the Geelong Grammar School as classical master under the pretense that he had completed his degree at Oxford. He founded the School Quarterly, to which he contributed many poems, and the first collection of these was published at Geelong under the title Grammar School Verses in 1879, an exceedingly rare little pamphlet not listed in the bibliographies of either Serle or Miller. In 1882 he returned to England and continued his course at Oxford, graduating B.A. in 1885. 

He immediately returned to Australia and rejoined the staff of Geelong Grammar School. In 1893 Barwon Ballads by "C" was published in Melbourne, and at the end of 1896 Cuthbertson was encouraged to resign his position by the new Head Master Leonard Harford Lindon, who found his erratic behaviour unacceptable, and Cuthbertson agreed to do so. He had enjoyed a close relationship with the students of the school and the former Head Master, John Bracebridge Wilson, however, his alcoholism was well known and boys were placed on "Cuthy duty", which involved at times pulling him out of the gutter. After a visit to England he lived for a period at Geelong and then near Melbourne, still occasionally sending verse to the school magazine. He died suddenly from an overdose of veronal while staying with a friend at Mount Gambier on 18 January 1910. After his death a memorial edition of his poems, Barwon Ballads and School Verses, with portrait frontispiece, was published by members of the Geelong Grammar School.

Literary legacy
Much of Cuthbertson's work is occasional verse, only of interest to old boys of the school he loved so much and of a generally low standard; but he sometimes wrote verse with simplicity and restraint, which gives him a place among the poets of Australia. He is represented in several anthologies. As a school-master he was a strong influence, and set standards which have become traditions of the school. (See "In Memoriam, J.L.C.", Light Blue Days, by E. A. Austin).

References
P. L. Brown, 'Cuthbertson, James Lister (1851 - 1910)', Australian Dictionary of Biography, Volume 3, MUP, 1969, pp 514-515

External links
 
 

1851 births
1910 deaths
Schoolteachers from Glasgow
Australian poets
Australian schoolteachers
Alumni of Merton College, Oxford
People educated at Glenalmond College
Australian people of Scottish descent
Scottish poets
Writers from Glasgow
People from Geelong